Le Grand Magistery is an independent record label operating out of Bloomfield Hills, Michigan since 1996.  They have been home to a number of artists including A Cuckoo, A Girl Called Eddy, Always, Baxendale, The Blood Group, Cinéma Vérité, Computer Perfection, Flare, Kahimi Karie, Le Concorde (band), Mascott, Memphis, Momus, Moose (band), Mr. Wright, The Music Lovers, PAS/CAL, Louis Philippe, The Push Kings, Scarboro Aquarium Club, The Secret History, Mike Sheldon, Stars, and Toog.

Discography

Affiliated Releases

See also
 List of record labels

External links
 http://www.magistery.com/
 http://www.yahoogroups.com/group/legrandmagistery
 http://www.myspace.com/legrandmagistery

Grand Magistery, Le
Grand Magistery, Le
Companies based in Oakland County, Michigan
Bloomfield Hills, Michigan